"Worthy of My Song (Worthy of It All)" is a song performed by American contemporary worship collective Maverick City Music and American singers Phil Wickham and Chandler Moore featuring Mav City Gospel Choir. It was released as a standalone single on April 8, 2022. Phil Wickham released a solo studio-recorded version of the song on April 22, 2022. The song was written by Phil Wickham and Steven Furtick, with David Brymer and Ryan Hall being credited as songwriters on account of the sampling of the song "Worthy of It All."

"Worthy of My Song (Worthy of It All)" debuted at number 27 on the US Hot Christian Songs chart, and at number 11 on the Hot Gospel Songs chart.

Composition

Commercial performance
"Worthy of My Song (Worthy of It All)" debuted at number 27 on the US Hot Christian Songs chart, and number 11 on the Hot Gospel Songs chart dated April 23, 2022.

Music video
On April 8, 2022, Tribl released the music video of "Worthy of My Song (Worthy of It All)" by Maverick City Music featuring Phil Wickham and Chandler Moore and Mav City Gospel Choir, filmed at Barclays Center in Brooklyn, New York.

Track listing

Charts

Release history

References

External links
 

2022 songs
Maverick City Music songs
Phil Wickham songs
Chandler Moore songs
Songs written by Phil Wickham
Songs written by Steven Furtick
Songs written by Chandler Moore